Indian pop music, also known as Indi-pop, refers to pop music produced in India that is independent from filmi soundtracks for Indian cinema. Indian pop is closely linked to Bollywood, Kollywood, Tollywood and the Asian Underground scene of the United Kingdom. The variety of South Asian music from different countries are generally known as Desi music.

History

Pop music originated in the South Asian region with the playback singer Ahmed Rushdi's song "" in 1966 and has since then been adopted in India, Bangladesh, and lately Sri Lanka, and Nepal as a pioneering influence in their respective pop cultures. Following Rushdi's success, Christian bands specialising in jazz started performing at various night clubs and hotel lobbies in various Southeast Asian cities. They would usually sing either famous American jazz hits or cover Rushdi's songs.

Pop music began gaining popularity across the Indian subcontinent in the early 1980s, with Pakistani singers Nazia and Zoheb Hassan forming a sibling duo whose records, produced by Biddu, sold as many as 60 million copies. Biddu himself previously had success in the Western world, where he was one of the first successful disco producers in the early 1970s, with hits such as the hugely popular "Kung Fu Fighting" (1974).

The term Indipop was first used by the British-Indian fusion band Monsoon in their 1981 EP release on Steve Coe's Indipop Records. Charanjit Singh's Synthesizing: Ten Ragas to a Disco Beat (1982) anticipated the sound of acid house music, years before the genre arose in the Chicago house scene of the late 1980s, using the Roland TR-808 drum machine, TB-303 bass synthesizer, and Jupiter-8 synthesizer.

In the late 2000s, Indi-pop music faced increasing competition from filmi music. Major pop singers stopped releasing albums and started singing for movies. Recently, Indian pop has taken an interesting turn with the "remixing" of songs from past Indian movie songs,  new beats being added to them.

Lists

Best-selling albums

Music video streams

References

 
Indian music
Indian styles of music
Performing arts in India
South Asian music
Entertainment in India
Pop music by country